Johann Stobäus (6 July 158011 September 1646) was a North German composer and lutenist.

Life 
Stobäus was born at Graudenz, now in Poland. From 1599 to 1608 he was a pupil of Johannes Eccard, the Kapellmeister of Königsberg. In 1601 he joined the princely Kapelle as a bass singer, and in 1602 he became Kantor at Königsberg Cathedral. In 1626 he succeeded Eccard as Kapellmeister, remaining in the post until his death. He died at Königsberg.

Stobäus, known as Stobaeus Grudentinus Borussus for his birthplace, wrote music for liturgical use, as well as songs and compositions for lute. Much of his manuscript music was lost in World War II; what remains is largely held at the Staatsbibliothek zu Berlin. Stobäus's Commonplace Book, containing songs, instrumental music and drawings of instruments, is preserved at the British Library (Sloane MS 1021).

Works 
 Cantiones Sacrae 5–10. v. item Magnificat, Frankfurt/Oder 1624
 Geistliche Lieder auf gewöhnliche Preußische Kirchenmelodien, Danzig 1634
 Erster und Ander Theil der Preußischen Fest-Lieder, 5-8 voices (incomplete), Elbing 1642 and Königsberg 1644, including a motet "Such, wer da will, ein ander Ziel" with his own melody

Recordings
 Stobaeus, Johann: "Lob- unnd Danck Lied (Gott ist und bleibt der König)", and "Ein anderes auf denselben von Gott gnädigst verliehenen sechsjährigen Stillstand. Anno 1630". Königsberg: Lorentz Segebad, 1630. In Friedens-Seufftzer und Jubel-Geschrey - Music for the Peace of Westphalia. Weser-Renaissance Ensemble Bremen dir. Manfred Cordes. cpo

References

1580 births
1646 deaths
German Baroque composers
People from the Kingdom of Prussia
People from West Prussia
People from Grudziądz
17th-century classical composers
German male classical composers
17th-century male musicians